Emmalocera endopyrella is a species of snout moth in the genus Emmalocera. It was described by George Hampson in 1918. It is found in Assam, India.

References

Moths described in 1918
Emmalocera